Hans Peterson (26 October 1922 – 16 August 2022) was a Swedish writer, mainly of children's literature.

Personal life
Peterson was born on 26 October 1922 in Väring, Västergötland, Sweden. 

He died, reportedly by suicide, on 16 August 2022, at the age of 99.

Prizes and recognition
Peterson received a number of prizes and recognition for his work, including:
 The Svenska Dagbladet Literature Prize, 1955
 The Nils Holgersson Plaque, 1958 (for )
 German Prize for Children's Literature, 1959
 The Astrid Lindgren Prize, 1971
 Wettergrens barnbokollon, 1992

Works

References

1922 births
2022 deaths
2022 suicides
People from Skövde Municipality
Swedish children's writers
Writers from Västergötland